"Nowhere to Hide" is a song by American hard rock band Crobot. The song was released in early 2014 as the lead off single from the band's second album, Something Supernatural, and peaked at number 16 on the Billboard Mainstream Rock Songs chart.

Chart performance
The song was the first song by the band to chart, reaching number 16 on the Billboard Mainstream Rock Songs  chart, as well as number 49 on the Billboard Rock Airplay chart.

Charts

Release history

References

2014 songs
2014 singles
Crobot songs
Wind-up Records singles